Eyton is a surname. Notable people with the surname include:

Audrey Eyton, animal welfare campaigner and author of The F-Plan Diet
Bessie Eyton (1890–1965), American actress
Charles Eyton (1871–1941), actor and producer
Frank Eyton (1894–1962), English lyricist
John Eyton, Welsh politician in the 17th century
Kenrick Eyton (1607–1681), Welsh lawyer and politician
Robert William Eyton (1815–1881), English antiquarian
Stephen Eyton (14th century), English chronicler
Thomas Eyton (politician) (c1682–1757), English landowner and politician  
Thomas Eyton (c1843–1925), New Zealand public servant and soldier
Thomas Campbell Eyton (1809–1880), English naturalist
Trevor Eyton (1934–2019), Canadian businessman and Senator